The 1991 Rutgers Scarlet Knights football team represented Rutgers University in the 1991 NCAA Division I-A football season. In their second season under head coach Doug Graber, the Scarlet Knights compiled a 6–5 record, scored 217 points, allowed 217 points, and finished in sixth place in the Big East Conference. The team's statistical leaders included Tom Tarver with 1,969 passing yards, Antoine Moore with 627 rushing yards, and James Guarantino with 740 receiving yards.

Schedule

References

Rutgers
Rutgers Scarlet Knights football seasons
Rutgers Scarlet Knights football